The Ukraine women's national under-20 basketball team is a national basketball team of Ukraine, administered by the Basketball Federation of Ukraine. It represents the country in women's international under-20 basketball competitions.

FIBA U20 Women's European Championship participations

See also
Ukraine women's national basketball team
Ukraine women's national under-18 basketball team
Ukraine women's national under-16 basketball team

References

External links
Archived records of Ukraine team participations

Ukraine women's national basketball team
Women's national under-20 basketball teams